11th Joseph Plateau Awards
1997

Best Film: 
 La promesse 
The 11th Joseph Plateau Awards honoured the best Belgian filmmaking of 1996 and 1997.

Winners and nominees

Best Belgian Actor
 Jan Decleir - Character (Karakter)
Stany Crets - Alles moet weg
Peter Van den Begin - Alles moet weg

Best Belgian Actress
 Sophie Leboutte - La promesse
Inge De Waele - La Sicilia
Sabrina Leurquin - Gaston's War

Best Belgian Director
 Jean-Pierre and Luc Dardenne - La promesse
Alain Berliner - My Life in Pink (Ma vie en rose)
Robbe De Hert - Gaston's War

Best Belgian Film
 La promesse
Character (Karakter)
Alles moet weg

Box Office Award
 My Life in Pink (Ma vie en rose) 
 La promesse

Joseph Plateau Life Achievement Award
 Gina Lollobrigida 
 Sydney Pollack 
 David Puttnam

1997 film awards
Belgian film awards